The 2019 UCI Road World Championships was the 92nd edition of the UCI Road World Championships, the annual world championships for road bicycle racing. It took place between 22 and 29 September 2019 in the historic county of Yorkshire, United Kingdom, the fourth to be held in the United Kingdom. The championships are traditionally hosted by a single town or city but, while each event in 2019 finished in the North Yorkshire town of Harrogate, the whole historic county of Yorkshire was the official host. Heavy rainfall caused some of the events to be re-routed and delayed.

Men and women were split into the categories of elite, under-23 (only men) and junior, competing individually in the two traditional road race and time trial disciplines of road bicycle racing. The 2019 championships saw the introduction of the mixed team relay, a team time trial which was raced together by the elite men and women. Mads Pedersen of Denmark won the men's elite road race and Annemiek van Vleuten of the Netherlands won the women's elite road race. The elite time trial titles were taken by Australian Rohan Dennis and American Chloé Dygert Owen.

Race locations

In July 2017, it was announced that Harrogate would host two circuit races and the other races were to start in locations across the historic county of Yorkshire, including Beverley, Doncaster, Leeds, Northallerton, Ripon and York.

At the 2018 UCI Road World Championships in September 2018, further details for the championships were announced. Ripon was announced to hold the start of two time trials, while the men's time trial will start in Northallerton. For the road races, Richmond was announced as the start location for the men's junior road race, while Doncaster would hold the start for the two remaining age-group races. The elite races were announced to be starting in Bradford (women) and Leeds (men) respectively.

The men's and women's elite road races followed separate routes before entering a  circuit in and around the town of Harrogate.

Schedule
All times listed below were for the local time – British Summer Time or UTC+01:00.

Race summaries

Elite men's road race

Mads Pedersen surprised in the men's road race by becoming the first Danish world champion in the event after winning the sprint in a three-man breakaway. Italy's Matteo Trentin started the sprint but took silver while Stefan Küng of Switzerland took bronze. One of the favourites, Mathieu van der Poel of the Netherlands, had also been in the breakaway but could not follow it on the last lap and finished over ten minutes behind. The day was marred by atrocious, torrential, downpours and bitterly cold, windy weather. This left four men where Italy's Gianni Moscon later lost contact; he finished in fourth place but was unable to help his teammate Trentin. Three-time champion Peter Sagan of Slovakia made a late breakaway from a larger chase group but could not catch the leaders and came fifth, followed by Michael Valgren of Denmark.

Elite women's road race

Defending champion Anna van der Breggen, also of the Netherlands, finished as runner-up, with Australian cyclist Amanda Spratt finishing in third.

Elite time trials 
Defending champion Rohan Dennis of Australia won by more than a minute. The silver went to the 19-year-old Belgian Remco Evenepoel who skipped the under-23 event after winning both the road race and time trial for juniors in 2018. Italy's Filippo Ganna rounded out the podium.

The American Chloé Dygert Owen won by 1 minute 32 seconds, the largest margin ever in a world championship time trial. Anna van der Breggen took silver. Two-time defending champion Annemiek van Vleuten, had to settle with bronze. Four days later she won the road race after riding solo for more than three times as long.

The inaugural event was won by one of the favourites, the Dutch team, with the female trio of Lucinda Brand, Riejanne Markus, Amy Pieters, and the male triumvirate Koen Bouwman, Bauke Mollema and Jos van Emden. Germany and the host Great Britain took silver and bronze, 23 seconds and 51 seconds behind.

Under-23 events 

As usual, there were only under-23 events for men. In the road race, Nils Eekhoff of the Netherlands won the sprint in a seven-man group but was later disqualified for drafting behind his team car for too long after a crash. The gold then went to Italy's Samuele Battistella. Stefan Bissegger of Switzerland was elevated to silver and Tom Pidcock got into the podium with a bronze for the British hosts.

The Danish favourite Mikkel Bjerg won his third consecutive gold in the under-23 time trial. The Americans Ian Garrison and Brandon McNulty took silver and bronze one second apart, but 27 seconds behind Bjerg who started as the last rider.

Junior events 
Both junior road races were won by Americans. Quinn Simmons finished solo in the men's race while Megan Jastrab won a sprint for women. The victories contributed to the United States winning the most golds in the 2019 championships, three in total.

Antonio Tiberi of Italy won the junior time trial for men by 8 seconds. Russia's Aigul Gareeva won for women by four seconds.

Events summary

Elite events

Under-23 events

Junior events

Medal table

Legacy
The legacy of the Worlds event has been reported with £15 million worth of funding to go towards the construction of 27 off-road racing venues around the country, "to ensure that every part of Britain has close access to a closed road circuit, velodrome, BMX track or mountain bike trail".

See also
Tour de Yorkshire

Notes

References

External links

 

 
UCI Road World Championships by year
International cycle races hosted by the United Kingdom
World Championships
UCI Road World Championships
Sport in Harrogate
UCI Road World Championships
2010s in North Yorkshire